Maorimorpha is a small genus of sea snails, marine gastropod mollusks in the family Mitromorphidae, in the superfamily Conoidea the cone snails and their allies.

Species
 Maorimorpha secunda Powell, 1942
 Maorimorpha sulcata (Sowerby III, 1892)
 Maorimorpha suteri (Murdoch, 1905)

References

 Powell, Arthur William Baden. "The Mollusca of Stewart Island." Records of the Auckland Institute and Museum 2.4 (1939): 211–238.

External links
 Bouchet, P.; Kantor, Y. I.; Sysoev, A.; Puillandre, N. (2011). A new operational classification of the Conoidea (Gastropoda). Journal of Molluscan Studies. 77(3): 273-308
 
 Worldwide Mollusc Species Data Base: Mitromorphidae

 
Gastropod genera